Agrupación Deportiva Arganda is a football club based in Arganda del Rey, Community of Madrid, Spain. The club was established in 1964 and play their home games at the Estadio Municipal de Arganda inaugurated in 1980 to replace the Campo de Las Cañas. Since its founding, the club has spent much of his career in the Regional and Preference Categories Madrid soccer, with sporadic participation in the Third División has participated in eight seasons. In 2009, the club returned to the Third División after 24 years.

History 
The club was founded by Julian Vadillo and Juanjo Pozo on 14 February 1964 and became part of the 3rd Regular Regional. In those beginning the Arganda played their home games in the Campo de Las Cañas. The beginning of the entity flows through the various echelons of the regional categories, until in June 1974 AD Arganda achieved one of their biggest hits after rising for the first time in their history after beating Third Division in the ascent phase to Zamora CF, Third Division team.

The club were framed in the Group II Third, along with historical teams today as the Club Atlético Osasuna, Getafe CF, Real Unión, CD Logroñés or SD Eibar.

The debut in the category ended in a 4–3 win at Atletico Madrileño, Atlético Madrid reserves. The adventure of the team lasted only one year, given their poor results achieved on the road, where he was unable to win a match, only tied on four occasions. However, as local victories achieved talked about, two 4–1 to Real Union and Industrial Béjar or Eibar 3–1.

The coach at that time was Jose Esteban de la Cita, and the squad was: Luis Mariano, Pichi, Valiela, Boyarizo, Rico, Carmona, Pinilla, Borja, Echebarría, Jorge Gil, Bajo, Martínez, Sutil, Poli, Quique, Vicioso II, Vicioso III, Ungria, Denche, and sporadically Olivares, Calleja, Fernández, Barrayo, Nieto, Zurro, Castellanos and Bustamante.

After two years, the Regional A.D. Arganda returned to Third Division, where it remained for four consecutive seasons. Those years served to strengthen the team and that, under the presidency of José de Llanos, be achieved by getting the city to build a new football stadium, the current Municipal Sports Stadium, opened in 1980.

Soon after, in 1982–83, was again achieved promotion to Third División, in which the club endured two seasons in the category. In 1983–84 the club argandeño that ended in what is to date his best season in the category, finishing in 14th place.

Preferential The return in 1985, a period of decline for the Arganda and with it a journey to the regional level until the 1987–88 season, in which the Club disappears because of the many debts that accumulated. After his disappearance, was formed UD Arganda, which brought together the local neighborhood teams.

This situation lasted until the 1991–92 season, the year that chairman Maximiliano Lopez takes over and manages, after City Council separated, that regains its original name Arganda, AD Arganda. A year later, in 1992–93, the Arganda returns to the preference category, which at different times managed to be among the top of the table and even stay at the gates of the rise, as happened in the 2005–06 season. Finally, it was the 2008–09 campaign in which the Arganda won the Third Division after he returned to consummate their league championship in Villarejo de Salvanés. For the first time since Maxi López became chairman, the team again reached the Third División.

In 2009, the Estadio Municipal de Arganda entered into a process of remodeling, so the AD Arganda had to play their games both at the Polideportivo de La Poveda as the new City of Football. The institution managed to put together a good set in the year of his return, 24 years later, but the economic problems that arose in the mid-campaign staff made the coach Paco Lobato and several players who came with him, leaving the club when the team marched in the comfort zone of the table.

In early season, it is usual every year the traditional dispute Trofeo Virgen de la Soledad, which takes place during the festivities of the town.

One of the most memorable players and representing the history of the club is Jorge Gil Montero, who spent ten seasons at the club between 1970 and 1980, coinciding with that golden decade of Arganda. Other major players in the club have been Agustín Pérez, who was twelve seasons with the Arganda and Manolito, which will be ten. They have rejected offers from clubs of a higher grade to stay in the team of their land. Finally, we also include striker Poli, Jose Manuel Mendez, the winger Antonio Azcona and goalkeeper Jesús Lamela.

Uniform 

Kit First: Red shirt, black trousers and half red and black.
Second kit: Blue T-shirt, white trousers and half white.

Stadium 

The AD Arganda plays its matches in the Municipal stadium of Arganda, with capacity of 3,000 spectators. Arganda's council rebuilt Municipal after AD Arganda's promotion to Tercera División. However, the council built a new training facilities in Arganda's City of Football. This new training grounds includes medical and training facilities for the first team.

Season to season

8 seasons in Tercera División

Notable players
 Eloy Edu

External links
ffmadrid.es profile
Profile

Association football clubs established in 1964
Football clubs in the Community of Madrid
Divisiones Regionales de Fútbol clubs
1964 establishments in Spain
Arganda del Rey